The Metamorphosis is a novella written by Franz Kafka which was first published in 1915. One of Kafka's best-known works, The Metamorphosis tells the story of salesman Gregor Samsa who wakes one morning to find himself inexplicably transformed into a huge insect and subsequently struggling to adjust to this new condition. The novella has been recreated, referenced, or parodied in various popular culture media.

Film
There are numerous film versions of the story, including:
 A 1975 television film by Jan Němec.
 A 1977 animated short film by Caroline Leaf.
 A 1987 television film of a stage adaptation by Jim Goddard, starring Tim Roth as Gregor Samsa.
 A 1993 short film by Carlos Atanes.
 A 1999 feature film by David Kalla.
 A 2002 feature film by Valery Fokin.
 A 2004 Spanish language short film by Fran Estévez.
 A 2012 feature film by Chris Swanton.
 A 2013 short film by Pencho.
 A 2017 Sinhala feature film Swaroopa by Dharmasena Pathiraja.
 The 1995 short film Franz Kafka's It's a Wonderful Life by Peter Capaldi tells the story of the author trying to write the opening line of The Metamorphosis and experimenting with various things that Gregor might turn into, such as a banana or a kangaroo. The short is also notable for a number of Kafkaesque moments. It won the Academy Award for Live Action Short Film.
 In the 2006 animated film Flushed Away, a stove falls through the floor of a house to show an annoyed cockroach sitting behind it, reading a French translation of Kafka's The Metamorphosis.
 The 1967 film The Producers, along with its stage musical adaptation, feature a scene in which Max Bialystock and Leo Bloom search for the worst possible play they can mount in order to commit investment fraud. Max reads the first sentence of The Metamorphosis aloud, and promptly declares that it is too good.
 The 2022 film Kuthiraivaal, takes some inspirations of The Metamorphosis with the protagonist who wakes up with a horse tail and not by becoming a cockroach.

Print
Jacob M. Appel's Scouting for the Reaper contains a telling of the novella in which a rabbi attempts to arrange a "proper Jewish burial" for Gregor.
Lance Olsen's book, Anxious Pleasures: A Novel After Kafka, retells Kafka's novella from the points of view of those inside his family and out.
American cartoonist Robert Crumb drew a comic adaptation of the novella, which is included in the 1993 book Introducing Kafka, an illustrated biography of Kafka also known as Kafka for Beginners, R. Crumb's Kafka, or simply Kafka. 
American comic artist Peter Kuper illustrated a graphic-novel version, first published by the Crown Publishing Group in 2003.
Marc Estrin's debut surrealist novel, Insect Dreams: The Half Life of Gregor Samsa (2002), "resurrects Kafka's half-cockroach Gregor character" vis-à-vis the world between 1915 and 1945.
East Press published a manga version of the story in 2008 as part of their Manga de Dokuha line.
The Meowmorphosis was released in 2011 by Quirk Books as part of the Quirk Classics series; a 'mash-up' retelling by Coleridge Cook, where Gregor Samsa wakes up as an adorable kitten, instead of a hideous insect.
A sequel Samsa in Love was written as a short story by Haruki Murakami in his 2017 book Men Without Women. It features Gregor Samsa, who had turned back into a human, and his encounter with a hunchbacked locksmith apprentice.
The 1992 children's novel Shoebag by Marijane Meaker (writing as Mary James) depicts the experiences of a young cockroach transformed into a human boy and struggling to cope with human life.  The story also features an appearance by a young man named Gregor Samsa who gives the protagonist tips on how to navigate school and social situations, as well as a process by which he may turn himself back into a cockroach and resume his old life.
 2007's Kockroach, by William Lashner under the name "Tyler Knox", inverts the premise by transforming a cockroach into a human; Lashner has stated that The Metamorphosis is "the obvious starting point for" Kockroach, and that his choice of pseudonym was made in honor of Josef K (of Kafka's The Trial).
 During the events of Marvel Comics' Deadpool Killustrated the titular assassin pays a visit to Gregor Samsa's apartment and shoots him to death, his beetle-like corpse being found by Sherlock Holmes.
Peter Kuper adapted The Metamorphosis into a graphic novel in 2004. The graphic novel has been translated into Portuguese, Italian, Turkish, and Hebrew

Stage and opera
Steven Berkoff performed a stage adaptation in 1969. Berkoff's text was also used for the libretto to Brian Howard's 1983 opera Metamorphosis. In 1989 Berkoff directed a Broadway production of a play, adapted by Berkoff, starring Mikhail Baryshnikov and René Auberjonois that opened at the Ethel Barrymore Theatre.
Another stage adaptation was performed in 2006 as a co-production between the Icelandic company Vesturport and the Lyric Hammersmith, adapted and directed by Gísli Örn Garðarsson and David Farr, with a music soundtrack performed by Nick Cave and Warren Ellis. It was also performed at the Sydney Theatre Company as part of a world tour in 2009 and returned to the Lyric Hammersmith in January 2013, starring Garðarsson as Gregor Samsa.

Music
 in 1975, The Rolling Stones released a compilation album titled Metamorphosis. The album cover alludes to the book with each member of the bands heads being replaced with a bug.
 in 1988, Philip Glass composed and performed a five movement arrangement called Metamorphosis. It refers to and was inspired by Kafka's novel and has been used for recorded readings and stage performances of the material.
In 2001, Athens, Georgia-based rock band Widespread Panic released Don't Tell the Band, their seventh studio album, featuring the track Imitation Leather Shoes, whose insectile protagonist bears a striking resemblance to Kafka's Gregor Samsa. The opening stanzas of the song are, "My little brother is an insect / He likes to crawl around his room / His mother shudders at the sight of him / His pappy is a businessman / Every move he makes is torture / He cannot speak words anymore / Our sister likes to flip him on his back / And watch little brother squirm," a reference to Gregor, his sister Greta, and their parents.
 The American Christian metal band, Showbread, references Metamorphosis several times on their 2004 album, No Sir, Nihilism Is Not Practical, including the lyric "You've locked the vermin in the other bedroom" in the song Mouth Like a Magazine and again in the song "Sampsa Meets Kafka".  The only lyrics to the song are "Gregor starved to death, No one dies of loneliness."  The misspelling of Samsa is intentional.
 The Swedish rapper, Bladee, alludes to Metamorphosis on his 2017 track "Insect".

Radio
A 1982 radio drama produced by The Mind's Eye theater company. It is adapted by, directed by, and stars Erik Bauersfeld.
A radio drama, combining Metamorphosis with Dr. Seuss performed by David Rakoff and Jonathan Goldstein and produced by Jonathan Goldstein and Mira Burt-Wintonick with Cristal Duhaime, was broadcast in 2008, on CBC Radio One's program Wiretap in 2008. In 2012, it was broadcast on episode 470 of This American Life.
In 2006, BBC Radio 4 adapted the novella for radio with the story being read by actor Benedict Cumberbatch.
First broadcast on 24 June 2017 on BBC Radio 4, writer Alan Harris gave the story a modern twist with a darkly comic edge as Kafka's Metamorphosis, directed by James Robinson, with Tom Basden as Gregor, Kenneth Collard as The Father, Felicity Montagu as The Mother and narrated by Peter Marinker

Video games
Polish game studio Ovid Works released a video game adaptation called Metamorphosis in 2020. In the first-person puzzle platformer, the player controls Gregor Samsa as he tries to regain his humanity.

Korean game studio Project Moon's game Limbus Company features a variety of characters based on classical literary figures and characters. Among these characters is Gregor, a tall man with an insect's arm over his right arm.

Filia, a character from the fighting game Skullgirls, has a bond with a parasitic, shapeshifting creature called Samson. One of her special moves is called "Gregor Samson", in reference to the character Gregor Samsa, and during this attack, Samson has a chance to call out "Metamorphosis!".

The 2015 survival-horror game Resident Evil: Revelations 2 features references to many of Kafka's works. Episode titles of the game come from different works of Kafka's, with Episode Four being titled "Metamorphosis". The game also features loading screens with various different quotes by Kafka, including from The Metamorphosis. Alex Wesker, one of the primary characters, is specifically fascinated by Kafka's works, comparing herself to both Kafka himself and Gregor Samsa.

Comics
 Bill Watterson’s newspaper comic strip Calvin and Hobbes references The Metamorphosis in several story arcs, including one where Hobbes references "Kafka dreams" prior to discovering a gigantic bedbug.
 Another comic strip, Bill Amend’s FoxTrot, also does a unique spin on the story.  Jason Fox, a science fiction buff, actually wants to be transformed into a hideous creature, and does get his wish.  However, he is horrified to discover that he had been transformed into a smaller duplicate of his sister Paige.  "Let's get you a training bra!" she says enthusiastically.
 Artist R. Sikoryak's series Masterpiece Comics features a mashup of The Metamorphosis and the comics strip Peanuts called "Good Old Gregor Brown", in which Charlie Brown takes on the role of Gregor Samsa.
 Jhonen Vasquez's indie comic Johnny the Homicidal Maniac has at least one instance of an immortal cockroach named "Mr. Samsa".
 The 2016 hentai manga Metamorphosis (manga) (also known as Emergence), is loosely based on The Metamorphosis. The main character, Saki Yoshida, is an asocial middle school graduate who decides to get a makeover to get friends, only to have her life go through a downward spiral as she is used, abused, and abandoned by everyone she knows.
 A Sunday panel of the comic strip "Lio" shows Lio eating "Kafka Krunchies with Metamorshmallows" for breakfast one morning.  The cereal box indicates a surprise inside which is a live cockroach that crawls out of the box.

Television
the 2nd OVA of Bludgeoning Angel Dokuro-chan in 2007 makes recurring reference to Gregor Samsa and illustrates him

 A 2001 episode of Home Movies, entitled "Director's Cut", includes "The Frank Kafka Rock Opera," a musical version of The Metamorphosis.

 1992 episode of "Northern Exposure" "Cicely" Season 3, Episode 23 Franz Kafka, who has the appearance of Joel, arrives at the founding of Cicely, the "Paris of the North" circa 1909, to meet with Roslyn and hopefully cure his writer's block and migraines. With the help of Mary (Maggie), he is able to establish the premise for Metamorphosis.

 2001: Season one episode 2 of “Smallville” is entitled “Metamorphosis” in which Greg Arkan (a student at Smallville High) is given bug like powers. The character Cloe Sullivan even states “if he really has gone Kafka…”

Trivia
 In the fighting game Skullgirls, the character Filia has a special move entitled "Gregor Samson" (a play on her parasite's name, Samson) which allows her to take on the form of a giant moth. Samson will occasionally cry out "Metamorphosis" while doing so.
 The 2002 anthology Dreaming of Angels, edited by Monica J. O'Rourke and Gord Rollo, contains a short story titled "Mickeymorphosis", in which the main character awakens to discover that he's turned into Mickey Mouse.
 In the manga Tokyo Ghoul the character Kaneki Ken mentions reading a book called Dear Kafka, which is the bestselling book by Sen Takatsuki. Within Dear Kafka, Kaneki mentions a story about a man turning into an insect.
 In the Korean drama Hell Is Other People the character So Jung-hwa, who's a police officer, dropped off a novel that's assumed to be Yoon Jong-woo's. It appeared to be Franz Kafka's The Metamorphosis.
 In the James Morrow novel Only Begotten Daughter a character wonders what sort of children's novel Kafka might have written:  "Gregor Samsa was having a really yucky morning..." 
 In the anime series Godzilla Singular Point, the character Mei Kamino mentions Gregor Samsa as a comparison to Pelops II, the AI on her computer, potentially being a giant bug on another device.
 In the manga series Kaiju No. 8 the main character is named Kafka Hibino, a man who has the ability to transform into a monster.
 On at least two occasions Nintendo of America has used excerpts from The Metamorphosis and Lorem ipsum as placeholder text during renovation periods of their games' official websites; for Animal Crossing in 2018 in anticipation of Animal Crossing: New Horizons (2020); and Kirby in 2021 in anticipation of Kirby and the Forgotten Land (2022).
 In the White Wolf Publishing tabletop role-playing game Werewolf: The Apocalypse the name used for cockroach based therianthropes is Samsa.

References

Literature in popular culture
Adaptations of works by Franz Kafka